Live from City Winery Nashville is a live album released by American country artist Sara Evans and the Barker Family Band. It was released on August 30, 2019 via Born to Fly Records. The release is Evans's first and only live album to date. It is the second release Evans did with the Barker Family Band, a family musical group that included her children and siblings.

Background and content
Live from City Winery Nashville is the second collaborative project between Evans and the Barker Family Band. The album was released following their concerts at various City Winery venues across the United States in mid 2019. The album includes songs previously released on their 2019 extended play as well as new tracks previously unreleased. Among the new tracks featured on the album are cover versions of songs recorded by other artists. This includes "Why Not Me" by The Judds, "As" by Steve Wonder and "Tennessee Whiskey" by David Allan Coe.

Also included on the album is hits previously made famous by Evans herself. This includes "Suds in the Bucket" and "Born to Fly". On the latter track, the Fairground Saints are featured providing harmony vocals.

Promotion and reception
To promote the live album, two tracks were offered for purchase: "A Little Bit Stronger" was made available August 16 and "Tennessee Whiskey" was made available on August 23. The album has since received praise from writers and journalists. Writers of the BroadwayWorld online magazine praised the vocals from Evans's children, calling them "mesmerizing harmonies." Guitar Girl Magazine also praised the harmony vocals on the album in their 2019 review of the album.

Track listing

Release history

References

2019 live albums
Sara Evans albums